The Vaza-Barris River is a river in northeastern Brazil. 
The Vaza-Barris originates in northeastern Bahia state, and flows east through Bahia and Sergipe states to empty into the Atlantic Ocean near São Cristóvão.

Course

The source of the river is at the foot of the Serra dos Macacos in interior of Bahia near the town of Uauá.
In the municipality of Canudos, Bahia, the river is impounded by the Cocorobó Dam.
Further east, the river defines the south boundary of the Serra Branca / Raso da Catarina Environmental Protection Area in the municipality of Jeremoabo, Bahia.
After leaving Bahia it flows through Sergipe to the coast.

See also
List of rivers of Bahia
List of rivers of Sergipe

References

Sources

Rivers of Bahia
Rivers of Sergipe